Subcancilla is a genus of sea snails, marine gastropod mollusks in the subfamily Isarinae of the family Mitridae.

Species
Species within the genus Subcancilla include:

 Subcancilla attenuata (Broderip, 1836)
 Subcancilla belcheri (Hinds, 1843)
 Subcancilla calodinota (S. S. Berry, 1960)
 Subcancilla candida (Reeve, 1845)
 Subcancilla directa (Berry, 1960)
 Subcancilla edithrexae Sphon, 1976
 Subcancilla erythrogramma (Tomlin, 1931)
 Subcancilla foveolata (Dunker, 1863) (temporary name)
 Subcancilla funiculata (Reeve, 1844)
 Subcancilla gigantea (Reeve, 1844)
 Subcancilla haneti (Petit de la Saussaye, 1852)
 Subcancilla hindsii (Reeve, 1844)
 Subcancilla joapyra Simone & Cunha, 2012
 Subcancilla larranagai (Carcelles, 1947)
 Subcancilla leonardhilli Petuch, 1987
 Subcancilla leonardi (Petuch, 1990)
 Subcancilla lindae Petuch, 1987
 Subcancilla lopesi (Matthews & Coelho, 1969)
 Subcancilla malleti (Petit de la Saussaye, 1852)
 Subcancilla phorminx (S. S. Berry, 1969)
 Subcancilla pia (Dohrn, 1860)  (temporary name)
 Subcancilla rhadina (Woodring, 1928)  (temporary name)
 † Subcancilla scrobiculata (Brocchi, 1814) 
 Subcancilla sulcata (Swainson, 1825)

Species brought into synonymy
 Subcancilla abyssicola: synonym of Profundimitra abyssicola (Schepman, 1911)
 Subcancilla amoena (A. Adams, 1853): synonym of Imbricaria amoena (A. Adams, 1853)
 Subcancilla annulata: synonym of Imbricaria annulata (Reeve, 1844)
 Subcancilla baisei: synonym of Imbricaria baisei Poppe, Tagaro & Salisbury, 2009
 Subcancilla bellulavaria: synonym of Imbricaria bellulavaria Dekkers, Herrmann, Poppe & Tagaro, 2014
 Subcancilla circula (Kiener, 1838): synonym of Domiporta circula (Kiener, 1838)
 Subcancilla fibula: synonym of Cancilla fibula Poppe, Tagaro & Salisbury, 2009 
 Subcancilla filaris (Linnaeus, 1771): synonym of Domiporta filaris (Linnaeus, 1771)
 Subcancilla flammea: synonym of Imbricaria flammea (Quoy & Gaimard, 1833)
 Subcancilla hidalgoi (G. B. Sowerby III, 1913): synonym of Imbricaria hidalgoi (G. B. Sowerby III, 1913)
 Subcancilla hrdlickai: synonym of Imbricaria hrdlickai (Salisbury, 1994)
 Subcancilla insculpta: synonym of Imbricaria insculpta (A. Adams, 1853)
 Subcancilla interlirata: synonym of Imbricaria interlirata (Reeve, 1844)
 Subcancilla juttingae Koperberg, 1931: synonym of Gemmulimitra duplilirata (Reeve, 1845)
 Subcancilla lichtlei Herrmann & R. Salisbury, 2012: synonym of Domiporta lichtlei (Herrmann & R. Salisbury, 2012) (original combination)
 Subcancilla lindsayi (Berry, 1960): synonym of Subcancilla calodinota (S. S. Berry, 1960)
 Subcancilla philpoppei: synonym of Imbricaria philpoppei Poppe, Tagaro & Salisbury, 2009
 Subcancilla praestantissima: synonym of Domiporta praestantissima (Röding, 1798)
 Subcancilla pugnaxa: synonym of Imbricaria pugnaxa Poppe, Tagaro & Salisbury, 2009
 Subcancilla ruberorbis: synonym of Imbricaria ruberorbis (Dekkers, Herrmann, Poppe & Tagaro, 2014)
 Subcancilla rufescens (A. Adams, 1853): synonym of Neocancilla rufescens (A. Adams, 1853)
 Subcancilla rufogyrata: synonym of Imbricaria rufogyrata Poppe, Tagaro & Salisbury, 2009
 Subcancilla salisburyi (Drivas & Jay, 1990): synonym of Imbricaria salisburyi (Drivas & Jay, 1990)
 Subcancilla shikamai (Habe, 1980): synonym of Domiporta shikamai Habe, 1980
 Subcancilla straminea (A. Adams, 1853): synonym of Isara straminea (A. Adams, 1853)
 Subcancilla tahitiensis Herrmann & R. Salisbury, 2012: synonym of Imbricaria tahitiensis (Herrmann & R. Salisbury, 2012) (original combination)
 Subcancilla turneri: synonym of Cancilla turneri Poppe, Tagaro & Salisbury, 2009 
 Subcancilla verrucosa (Reeve, 1845): synonym of Imbricaria verrucosa (Reeve, 1845)
 Subcancilla welkerorum Whitney, 1977: synonym of Ziba erythrogramma (Tomlin, 1931): synonym of Subcancilla erythrogramma (Tomlin, 1931)
 Subcancilla yagurai (Kira, 1959): synonym of Imbricaria yagurai (Kira, 1959)
 Subcancilla zetema: synonym of Imbricaria zetema (Dekkers, Herrmann, Poppe & Tagaro, 2014)

References

 Olsson A.A. & Harbison A. (1953). Pliocene Mollusca of southern Florida with special reference to those from North Saint Petersburg. Monographs of the Academy of Natural Sciences of Philadelphia. 8: 1-457, pls. 1-65.

External links
 Fedosov A., Puillandre N., Herrmann M., Kantor Yu., Oliverio M., Dgebuadze P., Modica M.V. & Bouchet P. (2018). The collapse of Mitra: molecular systematics and morphology of the Mitridae (Gastropoda: Neogastropoda). Zoological Journal of the Linnean Society. 183(2): 253-337

 
Mitridae
Gastropod genera